Ilias Hatzipavlis (born 24 May 1949) is a Greek sailor.  He won a silver medal in the Finn class at the 1972 Summer Olympics. He was named one of the 1972 Greek Athletes of the Year.

References

External links
 
 
 

1949 births
Living people
Greek male sailors (sport)
Olympic silver medalists for Greece
Olympic sailors of Greece
Sailors at the 1972 Summer Olympics – Finn
Sailors at the 1980 Summer Olympics – Finn
Sailors at the 1984 Summer Olympics – Star
Sailors at the 1988 Summer Olympics – Star
Olympic medalists in sailing
Medalists at the 1972 Summer Olympics
Sailors (sport) from Piraeus